Barnfields is a village in Staffordshire, England. The population at the 2011 census can be found under the Weeping Cross Ward of Stafford

Villages in Staffordshire